Jason Carl Urquidez (born September 12, 1982) is an American professional baseball pitcher who is a free agent. He previously played for the Tokyo Yakult Swallows of Nippon Professional Baseball (NPB).

Early career
Urquidez attended Central Arizona College and pitched for the team for two years, leading them to the NJCAA National Championship during his freshman year in 2002. Following his time at junior college, Urquidez was drafted by the Tampa Bay Devil Rays in the 48th round of the 2002 MLB draft, but opted to continue his collegiate career. He later transferred to Arizona State University, where he spent his junior and senior seasons in 2004 and 2005, respectively. Urquidez finished off his ASU career with a 22-7 record and 3.70 ERA in 48 games (34 starts) across two seasons. He was named to the first team All Pac-10 in his 2004 junior-year season after leading the league with 12 wins. He was selected in the 11th round of the 2004 MLB Draft (318th overall) by the Cincinnati Reds, but stayed at ASU for his senior season. In 2005, he was selected in the 17th round of the 2005 MLB Draft by the Arizona Diamondbacks.

Career

Minor leagues
Urquidez pitched in the Diamondbacks farm system during 2005–2011, starting out at the Class A Short Season level with the Yakima Bears of the Northwest League. He worked his way to Triple-A and pitched for both the Tucson Sidewinders and later the Reno Aces, operating as a relief pitcher and a closer. He became a free agent following the 2011 season.

On June 23, 2012, Urquidez signed a minor-league deal with the Boston Red Sox. Pitching for the Double-A Portland Sea Dogs out of the bullpen, he finished the season with a 4-2 record and 2.85 ERA. He elected free agency on November 2, 2012. 

In August 2013, Urquidez signed a minor-league contract with the Los Angeles Angels. He elected free agency on November 4, 2013.

Lancaster Barnstormers
Urquidez spent the 2013 and 2014 seasons, and part of the 2015 season with the Lancaster Barnstormers of the Atlantic League of Professional Baseball. Operating as the team's closer, he is currently the franchise's leader in saves, earning 54 of them.

Toros de Tijuana
On June 2, 2015, Urquidez had his contract purchased by the Toros de Tijuana of the Mexican League. He became the team's closer prior to the 2016 season, and that same year finished with 26 saves out of 27 opportunities. The following year Urquidez had his most successful to date, earning 28 saves and finishing with a 5-0 record and a league-leading 0.98 ERA, along with a 0.83 WHIP and 56 strikeouts across 46 innings pitched, culminating in the first-ever league championship for the team. He was selected to the LMB's All-Star team and won the 'Reliever of the Year' award. He is currently the franchise's leader in saves, with 64 earned through 4 seasons spent with the club.

Tokyo Yakult Swallows
On June 20, 2018, after pitching the first-half of the season in Tijuana, Urquidez was signed by the Tokyo Yakult Swallows of Japan's Nippon Professional Baseball. He became a free agent after the season.

Return to Tijuana
On February 21, 2019, Urquidez signed with the Toros de Tijuana of the Mexican League. He only appeared in 8 games for the club before being placed on the reserve list due to injuries. Urquidez was released by the organization on March 30, 2020.

References

External links

1982 births
Living people
American expatriate baseball players in Japan
American expatriate baseball players in Mexico
Arizona State Sun Devils baseball players
Baseball players from California
Cangrejeros de Santurce (baseball) players
Indios de Mayagüez players
Lancaster Barnstormers players
Liga de Béisbol Profesional Roberto Clemente pitchers
Mexican League baseball pitchers
Mobile BayBears players
Naranjeros de Hermosillo players
Nippon Professional Baseball pitchers
People from Tarzana, Los Angeles
Portland Sea Dogs players
Reno Aces players
Salt Lake Bees players
South Bend Silver Hawks players
Sultanes de Monterrey players
Tiburones de La Guaira players
American expatriate baseball players in Venezuela
Tokyo Yakult Swallows players
Toros de Tijuana players
Tucson Sidewinders players
Visalia Oaks players
Yakima Bears players
Charros de Jalisco players